Thorsten Wilhelms (born 31 July 1969 in Liebenau, Lower Saxony) is a German former cyclist.

Palmares

1993
1st stages 1, 6 and 7 Tour of Sweden
1st stage 3 Niedersachsen-Rundfahrt
1999
1st stage 5 Commonwealth Bank Classic
2000
1st stage 1 Troféu Joaquim Agostinho
2001
1st stages 3 and 5 Vuelta a Cuba
1st Prologue stage 1b Niedersachsen-Rundfahrt
1st stage 2 Troféu Joaquim Agostinho
2002
1st Tour of Qatar
1st stages 3 and 5
1st stage 1 Volta ao Algarve
1st stages 1 and 4 Niedersachsen-Rundfahrt
3rd Trofeo Palma de Mallorca
2003
1st stage 1b Niedersachsen-Rundfahrt

References

1969 births
Living people
German male cyclists
People from Nienburg (district)
Cyclists from Lower Saxony